The Philippines women's national floorball team is the women's national floorball team of the Philippines and is organized by Philippine Floorball Association.

History
The women's national team made their debut at the 2014 Southeast Asian Floorball Championships which was hosted in Singapore. The Philippines lost all its four games at its first tournament against the national teams of Indonesia, Malaysia and Singapore.

The Philippines participated in the 2018 Women's Asia-Oceania Floorball Cup which was also hosted Singapore. They lost their first group stage matches against Malaysia and Japan but won 12-6 over Iran. They finished fifth defeating India, 8-6 in their final classification match.

The Philippines made their first attempt to qualify for the Women's World Floorball Championship in 2019. The participated in the Asia Oceania qualifiers for the 2019 edition with the intention of using the qualification tournament as preparation for the country's hosting of the floorball event of the 2019 Southeast Asian Games. They lost all their matches placing last among eight teams conceding a narrow 3–4 loss to South Korea in the 7th-place play-off.

The team participated in the 30th Southeast Asian Games, held in the Philippines, at the University of the Philippines College of Human Kinetics Gym. In total, there were 5 countries competing in Floorball for both men and women: Philippines, Singapore, Indonesia, Malaysia and Thailand. The Philippines women's team did well on their first match, winning 8–1 against Indonesia. The team finished the tournament at 4th place, losing to Malaysia 0–1 at over time during the Bronze medal match.

The Philippines sweep all games of the preliminary round of the 2022 Women's Asia-Oceania Floorball Cup. However the Philippines lost its rematch against host Singapore in the final.

Colors

Records

World Championships

Asia-Oceania Floorball Cup

Southeast Asian Floorball Championships

Southeast Asian Games

Players 
The following are listed on IFF website.

Management

References

External links 
 
 Philippines - Team Card at the IFF

Philippines
Floorball
National team, Women's